Inside the Head of... Mr. Atom is a Man or Astro-man? 7-inch EP released on Estrus Records in 1995. It was recorded by Steve Albini. The cover art and design is by Art Chantry. The back cover states "This single is dedicated to the vital memory of the band Bolt Thrower." It was released on clear green vinyl, opaque purple vinyl, opaque gray vinyl and black vinyl.  Early pressings of the 7-inch have red and yellow center labels.  The center labels on later pressings are black and silver, and these were available on black vinyl and gray vinyl (a few are known to have white streaks marbled throughout the black vinyl).

Known variations

Early pressings (denoted by red and yellow center label)
Clear green vinyl
Opaque, marbled purple vinyl
Black vinyl

Later pressings (denoted by black and silver center label)
Black vinyl
Opaque gray vinyl
Black vinyl, marbled with white streaks

Track listing

Fore Brain
"Sferic Waves"
"Inside the Atom"

Hind Brain
"Put Your Fingers in the Socket"
"24 Hours"

Line Up
Captain Zeno - Spontaneous Combustion
Birdstuff - 440 Hair Stand Up Maneuver
Star Crunch - Evil Wool Sock Carpet Walk Shock Trick
Coco the Electronic Monkey Wizard - Complete Brown Out

References

Man or Astro-man? EPs
1994 EPs